Lorentz & Sakarias is a hip-hop duo from Stockholm, Sweden consisting of Lorentz Berger and Sakarias Berger. In their career, they have released two full-length albums. They have collaborated with Jan Johnston, Duvchi, and Newkid Their single "Mayhem", released in 2009, peaked at number 31 on the Swedish single chart.

Discography
2009: Vi mot världen
2012: Himlen är som mörkast när stjärnorna lyser starkast

References

Swedish hip hop groups
Musical groups from Stockholm
Singers from Stockholm
Swedish-language singers